Camilla Anne Luddington is a British actress, best known for her role as Dr. Josephine "Jo" Wilson in the ABC medical drama series Grey's Anatomy. She is known for voicing Lara Croft in the Tomb Raider video games, for which she provided the motion capture.

Early life
Luddington was born in Ascot, Berkshire, and at age 11 began studying at the Italia Conti Academy in England.  She moved to suburban Austin, Texas, United States when she was fourteen, and attended Westwood High School for one year. 

She returned to England after one year, and completed her education at The American International School in England (TASIS), in July 2002.

When she was nineteen, Luddington enrolled in Susquehanna University in Pennsylvania. However, she had not visited the university before she arrived as a student, and after six months she left and transferred to the New York Film Academy. 

In 2003, she was part of the school's first one-year acting class program. After training as an actor, Luddington returned home before moving to Los Angeles to pursue a career in acting.

Career

Film
Luddington had the lead role of Kate in William & Kate: The Movie (2011). In 2013 she appeared in the film The Pact II, in which she played a crime scene cleaner. In 2015, she joined the cast of The Healer as Cecilia.

Television
Luddington has worked mainly in the United States. Luddington joined the cast of the Showtime comedy-drama series Californication for its fifth season, playing a nanny. She joined the cast of season five of the HBO vampire drama True Blood, as Claudette Crane, a faerie. In July 2012, Luddington joined the cast of the ABC medical drama Grey's Anatomy as Dr. Jo Wilson, in a recurring role. In June 2013 it was announced that she would be a series regular from season ten onward. In October 2012, Luddington appeared on a Hallowe'en special of E!'s fashion programme Fashion Police, alongside a panel of Joan Rivers, Kelly Osbourne, George Kotsiopoulos, and Kris Jenner.

Tomb Raider
In June 2012, Crystal Dynamics confirmed Luddington would voice Lara Croft in the video game Tomb Raider. Luddington originally went into the audition for Lara thinking she was auditioning for a project called "Cryptids" with a character, which may have been called Sara. In June 2014, it was revealed that a sequel was in production, titled Rise of the Tomb Raider, and Luddington confirmed on her Twitter account that she would be returning to voice and motion capture Lara in the new game. Luddington also returned to reprise her role for Shadow of the Tomb Raider, released in September 2018.

Personal life
On 21 October 2016, Luddington announced that she was expecting a baby with fellow actor and boyfriend Matthew Alan. Their daughter, Hayden, was born on 9 March 2017. Luddington announced their engagement on 17 January 2018. Luddington and Alan married on 17 August 2019. Their son, Lucas, was born on 7 August 2020.

Filmography

Film

Television

Video games

Accolades

References

External links

1983 births
21st-century American actresses
21st-century English actresses
Actresses from Austin, Texas
Actresses from Berkshire
Alumni of the Italia Conti Academy of Theatre Arts
American film actresses
American television actresses
American video game actresses
American voice actresses
British expatriate actresses in the United States
English emigrants to the United States
English expatriates in the United States
English film actresses
English television actresses
English video game actresses
English voice actresses
Living people
People educated at the American School in England
People from Ascot, Berkshire
People with acquired American citizenship
Susquehanna University alumni